"Secreto" is a song by Puerto Rican rapper Anuel AA and Colombian singer Karol G. It was released on January 15, 2019, by Real Hasta la Muerte and Universal Music Latino. It reached number one on the Spanish charts, staying there for three weeks, as well as the top 40 in Italy, and number 68 on the US Billboard Hot 100. It was later given a 4× Platinum Latin certification from the RIAA.

Background 
The song, called a "pop-reggaeton duet about a torrid but hidden romance", was considered to be about Anuel AA and Karol G's prior rumored but unconfirmed relationship. The track leaked in December 2018, which the producers feared would hinder the song's success and demotivate the singers to promote it, but the song was successful regardless. Billboard described its lyrics as about the couple's "steamy love life in bed".

Music video 
The music video was also released on YouTube in January 2019, and features romantic scenes of Anuel AA and Karol G. Rolling Stone called it an "entire rom-com's worth of PDA". It achieved close to 100 million views in 10 days, and as of April 2020 has received over 1.0 billion views. The flower arrangements that the Puerto Rican made for the Colombian appear in the music video, made by Erika Mejía.

Charts

Weekly charts

Year-end charts

Certifications

See also 
 List of Billboard Argentina Hot 100 top-ten singles in 2019
 List of Billboard Hot Latin Songs and Latin Airplay number ones of 2019

References 

2019 singles
2019 songs
Anuel AA songs
Karol G songs
Spanish-language songs
Universal Music Latino singles